Micah Anthony Alberti (born August 19, 1984) is an American model and actor. Alberti began modeling as an adolescent and obtained his first acting job playing James Edward Martin on All My Children. After his one-year stint on the soap opera ended, Alberti appeared on prime-time guest spots (8 Simple Rules, Smallville) until he landed the role on the ABC Family drama Wildfire as troubled teen Matt Ritter. In 2009 he starred in the cable thriller Xtra Credit as a convicted teen attending a prison-reform school who is seduced by a teacher desperate to get out of her abusive marriage. 
He previously dated Rumer Willis before splitting in 2011.

Filmography

References

External links

1984 births
Living people
People from Oregon, Wisconsin
American male film actors
American people of Italian descent
American male television actors
Male models from Wisconsin